Humor Me is a 2017 American comedy film written and directed by Sam Hoffman. The film stars Jemaine Clement, Elliott Gould, Ingrid Michaelson, Annie Potts, Priscilla Lopez, Bebe Neuwirth and Maria Dizzia. The film was released on January 12, 2018, by Shout! Studios.

Plot
Nate Kroll is a playwright who suddenly loses his job, wife Nirit and home. With no other options, he moves in with his eccentric father, Bob, who lives in a retired people's community.

After barely settling in, only 24 hours there, Nate's dad gets him a job at the home in the laundry. Soon after being hired to fold towels, his retired military boss Ellis fires him. Wandering through a community area, Nate comes across The Cranberry Bog Players, a small group of residents planning to put on The Mikado.

Bob's girlfriend Connie, sharing a spliff with Nate, explains she started using to combat the effects of chemo. She met Bob when he was doing his weekly volunteering at the cancer ward, probably a habit he picked up from when he was visiting his wife, who didn't survive breast cancer. She proposes Nate help direct the play.

At the preliminary meeting, four women are present, none too sold on, or interested in the chosen work. Dee is one of the residents, and her daughter Allison, lives there, out-of-place, like Nate. She is complimentary of his work, and invites him to dinner at her mom's. He finds out she's there after detoxing in rehab, she's a musician and is thinking of moving to Seattle, far from New Jersey, to teach music.

One of the ladies takes an interest in Nate, which he skillfully dodges, pointing out Ellis's interest. Leaving her place on a Vespa, Ellis takes chase on a golf cart. On the way, Nate picks up Allison and they give him the slip. He has managed to convince her to give Ellis a chance, which he is grateful for.

Time goes on, Nate starts going with his dad power-walking, he gives his latest manuscript to Allison to proof and the play rehearsals progress. He has nightly Skype calls with his son Gabe in France, and finally gets some dental work done.

The Cranberry Bog Players, upon finding a video of Nate's successful screenplay, have a viewing at Bob's. It is basically the story of his parents dealing with her cancer. Bob angrily shuts it off, shortly needing to be rushed to the hospital. While waiting for him to wake from an induced coma, Connie hands Nate the key to a storage locker full of his mom's things.

Seeing Nate that night at his dad's, Allison confronts him about quitting. Telling him the new screenplay is good, although unfinished. She accuses him of being the reason why it is incomplete.

At the hospital, Nate and Connie take turns telling jokes to Bob, and can see he's reacting to them. He slowly comes out of the coma. Returning to the home, Nate asks if he may come back, making adjustments. At the performance, we see that clever slapstick jokes with sexual innuendo have been added to the routine. The producer who pulled out of his last play praises the performance. And his soon-to-be-ex also has come, bringing Gabe. She's made money in France, says she'll get divorce paper written up with joint custody, and he introduces his son to Allison.

The close starts with a playbill of the opening of Nate's recently opened show. Then we see the home, first from Gabe finishing a piano lesson with Allison, then they walk by ladies in dress rehearsal for a new performance, Ellis is with his lady, and they go through the changing area to reach the pool. Bob, Nate and Gabe cannonball into the pool.

Cast  
Jemaine Clement as	Nate Kroll
Elliott Gould as Bob Kroll
Ingrid Michaelson as Allison
Annie Potts as Dee
Priscilla Lopez as Connie Andrews
Bebe Neuwirth as C.C. Rudin
Maria Dizzia as Nirit Gerb-Kroll
Joey Slotnick as Zimmerman
Willie C. Carpenter as Ellis
Le Clanché du Rand as Helen
Rosemary Prinz as Gert
Erich Bergen as Randy Kroll
Cade Lappin as Gabe Kroll
Ray Iannicelli as Marv
Mike Hodge as Alan
Malachy McCourt as David
Tibor Feldman as Ed 
Bernie McInerney as Doctor

Release
The film premiered at the Los Angeles Film Festival on June 16, 2017. The film was released on January 12, 2018, by Shout! Studios.

Critical reception
On review aggregator website Rotten Tomatoes, the film holds an approval rating of 68% based on 19 reviews, and an average rating of 4.87/10. On Metacritic, the film has a weighted average score of 53 out of 100, based on 9 critics, indicating "mixed or average reviews".

References

External links
 
 

2017 films
2017 comedy films
American comedy films
2010s English-language films
2010s American films